Marco de Teramo (died 1439) was a Roman Catholic prelate who served as Bishop of Sarno (1418–1439), Bishop of Bertinoro (1404–1418), and Bishop of Monopoli (1400–1404).

Biography
On 24 March 1400, Marco de Teramo was appointed during the papacy of Pope Boniface IX as Bishop of Monopoli.
On 15 December 1404, he was appointed during the papacy of Pope Innocent VII as Bishop of Bertinoro.
On 29 December 1418, he was appointed during the papacy of Pope Martin V as Bishop of Sarno.
He served as Bishop of Sarno until his death in 1439.

Episcopal succession
While bishop, he was the principal consecrator of:
Rodrigo Regina, Titular Bishop of Demetrias (1437); 
and the principal co-consecrator of: 
Pandolfe de Malatesta, Bishop of Coutances (1420); 
Jean Guillaume Wilhjalmson, Bishop of Hólar (1426); and
Marco Cobello, Bishop of Castro del Lazio (1437).

References

External links and additional sources
 (for Chronology of Bishops) 
 (for Chronology of Bishops) 
 (for Chronology of Bishops) 
 (for Chronology of Bishops) 
 (for Chronology of Bishops) 
 (for Chronology of Bishops) 

15th-century Italian Roman Catholic bishops
Bishops appointed by Pope Boniface IX
Bishops appointed by Pope Innocent VII
Bishops appointed by Pope Martin V
1439 deaths
Bishops of Monopoli